Martina Hingis and Helena Suková were the defending champions but decided not to play together. Hingis teamed up with Arantxa Sánchez Vicario and lost in quarterfinals to Nicole Arendt and Manon Bollegraf, and Suková teamed with Larisa Neiland and lost in semifinals against the same pair.

Gigi Fernández and Natasha Zvereva defeated Arendt and Bollegraf in the final, 7–6(7–4), 6–4 to win the ladies' doubles tennis title at the 1997 Wimbledon Championships. It was the 4th Wimbledon title, 17th Grand Slam and 69th overall title for Fernández and the 5th Wimbledon title, 18th Grand Slam and 67th overall title for Zvereva, in their respective doubles careers.

Seeds

  Gigi Fernández /  Natasha Zvereva (champions)
  Martina Hingis /  Arantxa Sánchez Vicario (quarterfinals)
  Lindsay Davenport /  Jana Novotná (quarterfinals, withdrew)
  Larisa Neiland /  Helena Suková (semifinals)
  Mary Joe Fernández /  Lisa Raymond (quarterfinals)
  Nicole Arendt /  Manon Bollegraf (final)
  Conchita Martínez /  Patricia Tarabini (first round)
  Yayuk Basuki /  Caroline Vis (third round)
  Katrina Adams /  Lori McNeil (third round)
  Nathalie Tauziat /  Linda Wild (third round)
  Naoko Kijimuta /  Nana Miyagi (third round)
  Sabine Appelmans /  Miriam Oremans (semifinals)
  Alexandra Fusai /  Rita Grande (third round)
  Amy Frazier /  Kimberly Po (third round)
  Chanda Rubin /  Brenda Schultz-McCarthy (third round)
  Kristie Boogert /  Irina Spîrlea (second round)

Qualifying

Draw

Finals

Top half

Section 1

Section 2

Bottom half

Section 3

Section 4

References

External links

1997 Wimbledon Championships on WTAtennis.com
1997 Wimbledon Championships – Women's draws and results at the International Tennis Federation

Women's Doubles
Wimbledon Championship by year – Women's doubles